Băluşeşti may refer to several villages in Romania:

 Băluşeşti, a village in Dagâța Commune, Iaşi County
 Băluşeşti, a village in Dochia Commune, Neamţ County
 Băluşeşti, a village in Icușești Commune, Neamţ County